TurboSilver was one of the original 3D raytracing software packages available for the Amiga and for personal computers in general. It was first revealed by its creator Impulse at the October 1986 AmiEXPO.

November 1987 saw the release of version 2.0. Version 3.0 was released in January 1988.

Impulse created a replacement for it, named Imagine in 1990.

See also 

Sculpt 3D

References

3D graphics software
Amiga raytracers